Aragonese Castle is a castle in Reggio Calabria enlarged to its current extent by Ferdinand I of Aragon.

References 

Castles in Calabria
Buildings and structures in Reggio Calabria